Orgyia postica, the cocoa tussock moth or hevea tussock moth, is a species of moth of the subfamily Lymantriinae of family Erebidae found from the Oriental tropics of India, Sri Lanka, Myanmar, Borneo, Java, New Guinea and Taiwan. It was described by Francis Walker in 1855.

Description
The wingspan is 20–30 mm for males. In the male, the head, thorax, and abdomen are brownish. Forewings are brown with an indistinct oblique sub-basal line. Waved antemedial and postmedial lines approach each other at the lower angle of the cell. The area between them is slightly tinged with bluish grey and with a waved dark line edged with white on each side of the discocellulars. Two indistinct waved submarginal lines are present. The apex is slightly tinged with grey and with some subapical dark streaks. Hindwings are dark brown. The female is wingless.

Larvae are yellowish, clothed sparsely with brown hair. One dorsal and two lateral brown bands are seen. Paired tufts of hair are on the first and eleventh somites projecting forward and backward. Lateral tufts of grey hair project from the fourth and fifth somites. Dorsal tufts of yellow hair are on the fourth to seventh somites. The head is red. the pupa is stout; in males, it is glossy black, with numerous short, small tufts of hairs. Eggs are pillbox shaped, and pale whitish brown with a darker ring encircling a depressed top.

Ecology
Adult males are on wing year round. The name Orgyia is because the larvae have been recorded on a wide range of species, including Buchanania, Mangifera, Durio, Ochroma, Casuarina, Terminalia, Shorea, Hevea, Ricinus, Pelargonium, Cinnamomum, Acacia, Albizia, Caesalpinia, Cajanus, Cassia, Dalbergia, Erythrina, Pithecellobium, Pterocarpus, Sesbania, Xylia, Lagerstroemia, Eucalyptus, Tristania, Zizyphus, Malus, Coffea, Citrus, Santalum, Dimocarpus, Litchi, Nephelium, Theobroma, Camellia, Grewia, and Tectona. The head, legs, and prolegs are pale red. The body is longitudinally banded in dark brown and pale yellow. The four dorsal brushes are pale yellow.

The parasitoid wasps of Telenomus are known to attacks the eggs of this moth.

References

External links
Sexual dimorphism in developmental rate and ecdysteroid titre in Orgyia postica
Orgyia postica, Vietnam
Orgyia postica. Distribution map.
Semiochemicals of Orgyia postica, the Cocoa tussock moth

Moths described in 1855
Lymantriinae
Moths of Japan
Moths of Asia
Moths of Sri Lanka